Aradan District was a district (bakhsh) in Garmsar County, Semnan Province, Iran. At the 2006 census, its population was 15,418, in 4,437 families.   The District had one city: Aradan. The District had two rural districts (dehestan): Kohanabad Rural District and Yateri Rural District. The District was replaced in 2011 by Aradan County.

References 

Former districts of Iran
Former districts of Semnan Province
Garmsar County
2011 disestablishments in Iran